Bilyi or Bilyy is a Ukrainian surname derived from a word meaning "white" (білий). Feminine form: Bila (Біла). It may refer to:

Ivan Bilyi (born 1988), Ukrainian footballer
Maksym Bilyi (disambiguation), multiple people
Mykhailo Bilyi (1922–2001), Ukrainian Soviet politician
Oleh Bilyi (born 1993), Ukrainian footballer
Vasyl Bilyi (born 1990), Ukrainian footballer
Vladyslav Bilyi (born 1997), Ukrainian Paralympic athlete
Bilyi, a different transliteration of the same Ukrainian surname

See also
 
Bilyk
Bila (disambiguation)

References

Ukrainian-language surnames